Grant City is an unincorporated community in Wayne Township, Henry County, Indiana.

History
Grant City was platted in October 1868. It was named for Ulysses S. Grant, then known for his role as Commanding General of the United States Army, and afterward 18th President of the United States. The post office once located at Grant City was called Snyder. This post office operated from 1888 until 1901.

Geography

References

Unincorporated communities in Henry County, Indiana
Unincorporated communities in Indiana